Clijsters is a surname. Notable people with the surname include:

  (born 1950), Belgian banker and chief executive
 Lei Clijsters (1956-2009), Belgian football player
  (1962-2005), Belgian artist and poet
 Kim Clijsters (born 1983), Belgian tennis player and oldest daughter of Lei Clijsters
 Elke Clijsters (born 1985), Belgian tennis player and youngest daughter of Lei Clijsters

Surnames of Belgian origin
Dutch-language surnames